Joppatowne High School is a high school in Joppatowne, Harford County, Maryland, United States.

History
Joppatowne High School was established in 1973.

Homeland Security program
In August 2007, Joppatowne became the first high school to specialize in teaching skills useful to the industries serving U.S. Homeland Security. Mother Jones magazine reported that, funded by government agencies as well as defense firms, students in the school's "Homeland Security and Emergency Preparedness magnet program will study cybersecurity and geospatial intelligence, respond to mock terror attacks, and receive limited security clearances at the nearby Army chemical warfare lab." The school is also expected to offer lessons in Arabic and other languages useful to current US homeland security interests. The graduating class of 2010 featured the Homeland Security program's first graduates.

Location
Joppatowne High School is located on 555 Joppa Farm Road in Joppa, Maryland. The school is in the southwest corner of Harford County, just south of U.S. Route 40. The school borders the districts of Fallston High School and Edgewood High School.

Sports
 Fall: American football, cheerleading, boys' and girls' soccer, field hockey, cross-country, golf, boys and girls volleyball
 Winter: Boys' and girls' basketball, cheerleading, swimming, wrestling
 Spring: Track and field, boys' and girls' lacrosse, tennis, baseball, softball

Notable alumni 
 Richard K. Impallaria, State Delegate.
 John R. Thomas, Jay Thomas, class of 1985, is a professor of law at Georgetown University.
 Wendy Davis, class of 1984, works as an actress in Hollywood. Her latest project is the Lifetime series Army Wives. She has also appeared in episodes of Grey's Anatomy, Cold Case, Coach and many other shows. She was a regular in the series The New WKRP in Cincinnati and High Incident.
Thori Staples played on the US National women's soccer team.
 Jeremy Navarre, Former, defensive end for the Arizona Cardinals; former defensive end at the University of Maryland.
 Ron Stallings, class of 2001, Professional Mixed Martial Arts fighter, a Strikeforce veteran and current UFC fighter, Born and raised in Joppatowne Maryland, Attended and graduated from JHS, currently trains with Team Lloyd Irvin in Prince George's County and runs a school in Bel Air, MD

References

External links 
School profile on Harford County Public Schools website
Joppatowne High School website

Harford County Public Schools
Public high schools in Maryland
Educational institutions established in 1973
Magnet schools in Maryland
1973 establishments in Maryland